The 1997–98 season of the Norwegian Premier League, the highest bandy league for men in Norway.

10 games were played, with 2 points given for wins and 1 for draws. Stabæk won the league, whereas Drammen were relegated.

League table

References

Seasons in Norwegian bandy
1997 in bandy
1998 in bandy
Band
Band